Fuheis is a Christian majority town in the central Jordanian governorate of Balqa. It lies in Wadi Shueib between Salt and Amman, at a distance of 6 and 13 kilometers respectively. It has an elevation between 740-1050 meters above mean sea level. 

The population of Fuheis was estimated to be 21,908 in 2021, 87% are Jordanian citizens, 95% are Christians, and with a male-to-female ratio of 52:48.

According to a national census in 2015, the population was 18,916, there were 4,658 households in the town with an average of 4.06 persons per household, lower than the national average of 4.82 persons per household. The population of Fuheis increases in the summer, as many of the town's residents who have emigrated to the United States and Europe return for their summer vacations. The town's elevation renders it cool enough to spend the summer comfortably.  

Fuheis is also famous for its traditional habits from singing and dancing (dabke), and for depending on its farms.

History

The Jordanian census of 1961 found 2,946 inhabitants in Fuheis,  of whom 2,391 were Christians.

Economy and development 
Fuheis' economy has historically centered around agriculture. Most of Fuheis' population works in agriculture, trade, cement industry, service industry, and civil or office jobs. The olive industry is important to Fuheis' economy, along with orchards and vineyards. The cement factory - Jordan's largest - is by far the largest industry in Fuheis, employing about 70% of the town's population. Among its most important villages are al-Rahwa, Ras al-Jundi, and al-Suqariah, known for their farms and trees. 

In 2010, German researchers from the Helmholtz Centre for Environmental Research implemented a demonstration facility for decentralised wastewater technology in Fuheis. The project was handed over to the management of Al-Balqa` Applied University.

Religion 
Approximately 60% of the town's population belong to Greek Orthodox Church of Antioch, 35% are members of the Latin Patriarchate of Jerusalem. Sunni Muslims and Armenian Orthodox Christians make up the rest 5% of the population. 
The Latin Parish of Fuheis established a secondary school during the Ottoman Period in 1885. Students of this school learned Arabic, Religion and Math. The school has since expanded, remaining open until today.

Heritage and archaeology 
Archaeological excavations in Fuheis uncovered a circular building from white limestone which dates back to the Iron Age and the Byzantine age. This building was repurposed as a church in the Ayyubid and Mamluk periods, and within the building is a blueprint of the church in addition to a number of graves that were built in the church's land. The excavations suggest that the area's water sources may have drawn many to the region or that the settlement had a military purpose. The ruins are surrounded by small dug wells and enclosed water closets which were connected by a spout carved from rock. 
In the same area, excavators found a carving on basalt rock in Greek letters and crosses carved into limestone.

Culture

Al-Rowaq 
Fuheis' Rowaq Al-Balqa' district boasts hundred-year-old stone cottages in the old town, preserved by a local who bought an art gallery in the area and proceeded to buy several cottages near it, converting them to art-and-craft shops.

Fuheis festival 

Fuheis Festival is an annually held event in Fuheis, and it is considered to be the second biggest festival in Jordan, after Jerash Festival.

They have celebrated their silver jubilee in 2016, where they have welcomed bands and artists from Jordan, Syria, Palestine and Lebanon to perform in concerts and poetry evenings.

Several artists and singers from across the region were invited to perform in the town, like: Wadih El Safi, Melhem Barakat, Sabah Fakhri, Fares Karam, Moeen Charif, Omar Al-Abdallat, George Kurdahi, Najwa Karam,  and many more, and the variety of night events and activities attracts around 10,000 to 30,000 visitors yearly.

List of mayors of Fuhais

See also
 Greek Orthodox Church of Antioch
 Jordanian Christians

References

Bibliography

External links
 Fuheis.net 
 Photos of Fuheis from the American Center of Research

Populated places in Balqa Governorate
Christianity in Jordan